The most characteristic North American fashion trend from the 1930s to 1945  was attention at the shoulder, with butterfly sleeves and banjo sleeves, and exaggerated shoulder pads for both men and women by the 1940s.  The period also saw the first widespread use of man-made fibers, especially rayon for dresses and viscose for linings and lingerie, and synthetic nylon stockings. The zipper became widely used. These essentially U.S. developments were echoed, in varying degrees, in Britain and Europe.
Suntans (called at the time "sunburns") became fashionable in the early 1930s, along with travel to the resorts along the Mediterranean, in the Bahamas, and on the east coast of Florida where one can acquire a tan, leading to new categories of clothes: white dinner jackets for men and beach pajamas, halter tops, and bare midriffs for women.

Fashion trendsetters in the period included Edward VIII and his companion Wallis Simpson, socialites like Nicolas de Gunzburg, Daisy Fellowes and Mona von Bismarck and such Hollywood movie stars as Fred Astaire, Carole Lombard and Joan Crawford.

Womenswear

1930s

Overview 
The lighthearted, forward-looking attitude 
and fashions of the late 1920s lingered through most of 1930, but by the end of that year the effects of the Great Depression began to affect the public, and a more conservative approach to fashion displaced that of the 1920s. For women, skirts became longer and the waist-line was returned up to its normal position. Other aspects of fashion from the 1920s took longer to phase out. Cloche hats remained popular until about 1933 while short hair remained popular for many women until late in the 1930s and even in the early 1940s. The Great Depression took its toll on the 1930s womenswear due to World War II which dates from 1939 to 1945. This greatly affected the fashion of how women dressed during the 1940s. According to dress historian Jayne Shrimpton: "Committed to ensuring the fair distribution of scarce but essential resources, namely food, clothing, and furniture, the government introduced a comprehensive rationing scheme based on allocation of coupons - a system deriving, ironically, from the German rationing plan devised in November 1930."

Because of the economic crash, designers were forced to slash prices for clothing in order to keep their business afloat, especially those working in couture houses. Designers were also forced to use cheaper fabric and materials, and dress patterns also grew in popularity as many women knew how to sew.  Hence, clothing was made more accessible. Incidentally, there was also a continuation of mass production, which had been rising in popularity since the 1920s. The 1930s allowed women from all classes and socio-economic backgrounds to be fashionable, regardless of wealth. With prices slashed on types of fabrics utilized for designing, new inventions such as the zipper made the manufacturing of garments quicker and cheaper. This was also influenced by the rise in women entering the workforce alongside the rise of the working woman, as they still were able to afford to dress well and stay in style. Daywear also had to be functional, but it never lost its touch of elegance or femininity, as the dresses would still naturally highlight the female or womanly shape: with cinched waistlines, skirts fitted to the hip and fullness added to the hem with flared gores or pleats. Frilled rayon blouses also went with the cinched waist.

Because clothes were rationed and fabric was scarce, the hemlines of dresses rose to knee length. The main sort of dress in the 1940s included features such as an hour glass shape figure, broad shoulders, nipped in high waist tops and A line skirts that came down to just at the knee. Many different celebrities who embraced this type of style such as Joan Crawford, Ginger Rogers, Barbara Stanwyck, and Ava Gardner. Even though daywear dresses were influenced by the war, evening dresses remained glamorous. Women's undergarments became the soul of fashion in the 1940s because it maintained the critical hourglass shape with smooth lines. Clothes became utilitarian. Pants or trousers were considered a menswear item only until the 1940s. Women working in factories first wore men's pants but over time, factories began to make pants for women out of fabric such as cotton, denim, or wool. Coats were long and down to the knee for warmth.

Major fashion magazines at the time including Vogue continued to cater to the fashionable and wealthy women of the 1930s, regularly reporting and reflecting the most popular trends in that time period, despite the impact the economic crash had on them. The wealthiest still managed to afford and keep up with the most high-end or the most coveted designs and maintain their lifestyle.

Fashion and the movies 

Throughout the 1930s and early 1940s, a second influence vied with Paris couturiers as a wellspring for ideas: the American cinema. As Hollywood movies gained their popularities, general public idolized movie stars as their role models. Paris-based fashion houses were losing their power and influences in most major fashion trends during these years. Many American and European moviegoers were fascinated by and got interested in overall fashion including clothes and hairstyles of movie stars which led to various fashion trends. After the movie Tarzan, animal prints became popular. On the other hand, different styles such as bias-cut, satin, Jean Harlow-style evening dresses and the casual look of Katharine Hepburn also became famous. Paris designers such as Elsa Schiaparelli and Lucien Lelong acknowledged the impact of film costumes on their work. LeLong said "We, the couturiers, can no longer live without the cinema any more than the cinema can live without us. We corroborate each others' instinct.

The 1890s leg-o-mutton sleeves designed by Walter Plunkett for Irene Dunne in 1931's Cimarron helped to launch the broad-shouldered look, and Adrian's little velvet hat worn tipped over one eye by Greta Garbo in Romance (1930) became the "Empress Eugénie hat ... Universally copied in a wide price range, it influenced how women wore their hats for the rest of the decade." During late 1920s to early 1940s, Gilbert Adrian was the head of the costume department at Metro-Goldwyn-Mayer, the most prestigious and famous Hollywood movie studio. He produced numerous signature styles for the top actresses of the period, as well as countless fashion fads during those times. One of his popular dresses was the gingham dress, a cotton dress with a checked or striped pattern, that he made for Judy Garland for the movie The Wizard of Oz in 1939, and for Katharine Hepburn for the movie The Philadelphia Story in 1940. Movie costumes were covered not only in film fan magazines, but in influential fashion magazines such as Women's Wear Daily, Harper's Bazaar, and Vogue.

Adrian's puff-sleeved gown for Joan Crawford in Letty Lynton was copied by Macy's in 1932 and sold over 500,000 copies nationwide. The dress was appraised as one of the most influential pieces in the era's fashion, inspiring numerous designers to showcase similar styles in their own work. One of Crawford's widely influential pieces was a white organdy dress with ruffle adornments. With the use of shoulder pads, the dress made the movement freer, emphasizing the back by removing adornments previously popularized in the 1920s.

One of the most stylistically influential films of the 1930s was 1939's Gone with the Wind. The dresses in the movie were designed with simplified adornments and a mixture of different monotone hues as opposed to using a varied color palette. This was considered to be Plunkett's intentional design to utilize modernism, the emerging aesthetic of the 1930s. Plunkett received praise for producing costumes that adequately harmonized the era of the movie with the aesthetic sense of the late 1930s. The costumes brought back the Neo-Victorian style, as well as strong use of symbolic color. It inspired the Princess Ballgown, a Victorian style dress reduced to full A line skirts with petticoats underneath for fullness. It was the most popular style for teens going to prom.  Plunkett's "barbecue dress" for Vivien Leigh as Scarlett O'Hara was the most widely copied dress after the Duchess of Windsor's wedding costume, and Vogue credited the "Scarlett O'Hara" look with bringing full skirts worn over crinolines back into wedding fashion after a decade of sleek, figure-hugging styles.

Lana Turner's 1937 film They Won't Forget made her the first Sweater girl, an informal look for young women relying on large breasts pushed up and out by bras, which continued to be influential into the 1950s, and was arguably the first major style of youth fashion.

Travis Banton gained his fame by, after working at a couture house in New York, designing costumes for Marlene Dietrich as a head designer of Paramount. His style was softer and more alluring than Adrian's, embodying femininity by his sense of balance with the use of Vionnet's bias-cut, and was known for refined concepts of simple lines and classic styles. Many famous movie stars during the 1930s such as Magdalene Dietrich and Mae West at Paramount became the models of wit, intellect and beauty through Banton's elegant costumes. The costumes he made for Dietrich for various movies such as Shanghai Express 1932, and The Scarlet Empress 1934 portray her sharp regality.

Retail clothing and accessories inspired by the period costumes of Adrian, Plunkett, Travis Banton, Howard Greer, and others influenced what women wore until war-time restrictions on fabric stopped the flow of lavish costumes from Hollywood.

Hard chic and feminine flutters 

Jean Patou, who had first raised hemlines to 18" off the floor with his "flapper" dresses of 1924, had begun lowering them again in 1927, using Vionnet's handkerchief hemline to disguise the change. By 1930, longer skirts and natural waists were shown everywhere.

But it is Schiaparelli who is credited with "changing the outline of fashion from soft to hard, from vague to definite." She introduced the zipper, synthetic fabrics, simple suits with bold color accents, tailored gowns with matching jackets, wide shoulders, and the color shocking pink to the fashion world. By 1933, the trend toward wide shoulders and narrow waists had eclipsed the emphasis on the hips of the later 1920s. Wide shoulders would remain a staple of fashion until after World War II.

In contrast with the hard chic worn by the "international set". designers such as Britain's Norman Hartnell made soft, pretty dresses with fluttering or puffed sleeves and loose calf-length skirts suited to a feminine figure.  His "white mourning" wardrobe for the new Queen Elizabeth's 1938 state visit to Paris started a brief rage for all-white clothing.

Feminine curves were highlighted in the 1930s through the use of the bias-cut. Madeleine Vionnet was an early innovator of the bias-cut, using it to create clinging dresses that draped over the body's contours.

Through the mid-1930s, the natural waistline was often accompanied by emphasis on an empire line.  Short bolero jackets, capelets, and dresses cut with fitted midriffs or seams below the bust increased the focus on breadth at the shoulder. By the late 1930s, emphasis was moving to the back, with halter necklines and high-necked but backless evening dresses with sleeves.  Dinner dresses with matching jackets were worn to the theatre, nightclubs, and elegant restaurants.

Skirts remained at mid-calf length for day, but the end of the 1930s Paris designers were showing fuller skirts reaching just below the knee;  this practical length (without the wasteful fullness) would remain in style for day dresses through the war years.

Other notable fashion trends in this period include the introduction of the ensemble (matching dresses or skirts and coats) and the handkerchief skirt, which had many panels, insets, pleats or gathers.  The clutch coat was fashionable in this period as well; it had to be held shut as there was no fastening.  By 1945, adolescents began wearing loose, poncho-like sweaters called sloppy joes.  Full, gathered skirts, known as the dirndl skirt, became popular around 1945.

Accessories 
Gloves were "enormously important" in this period. They were a type of accessory that came to be seen as more of a comfort rather than for style. The elaborate trim was removed and was replaced by plain gloves. Evening gowns were accompanied by elbow length gloves, and day costumes were worn with short or opera-length gloves of fabric or leather.

Manufacturers and retailers introduced coordinating ensembles of hat, gloves and shoes, or gloves and scarf, or hat and bag, often in striking colours. For spring 1936, Chicago's Marshall Field's department store offered a black hat by Lilly Daché trimmed with an antelope leather bow in "Pernod green, apple blossom pink, mimosa yellow or carnation blush" and suggested a handbag to match the bow.

When war broke out in 1939, many women purchased handbags with a respirator pouch due to fear of poison gas attacks.

Sportswear 
During the mid to late 1930s, swimsuits became more revealing than those of the 1920s, and often featured lower necklines and no sleeves. These were made from nylon and rayon instead of the traditional wool, and no longer included a short modesty skirt. Experimental swimsuits made from spruce wood veneer were a fad in the early 1930s, but did not catch on among the mainstream.

Marriage of Wallis Simpson and King Edward VIII (from January 1936 until his abdication) 
Notable American socialite was Wallis Simpson and her marriage to Prince Edward was also seen as influential trendsetters during the 1930s period of fashion. Their marriage was historical, been called “The Greatest Love Story of the 20th Century” by some, due to the fact that Prince Edward was royalty and in line for the throne. However, his love affair with Wallis Simpson is what attracted attention and made headlines.

Simpson was not only a socialite, but she was American and a divorcee, both of which were deal breakers for the royal family at the time. As Prince Edward found he could not marry Simpson on these circumstances, he did the unthinkable by giving up the throne to marry her. As the two wed in 1937, their marriage marked a more progressive mindset that people slowly began to adopt, as people already wanted to ditch old traditions and trade it for new ones, especially for those in the royal family.

Their wedding and marriage was well chronicled by Vogue, including a spread of Wallis Simpson before her wedding day, captured by iconic fashion photographer, Cecil Beaton, which included the iconic Lobster dress by Elsa Schiaparelli, which included a hand-painted lobster by Salvador Dalí, a significant surrealist artist and painter in the 1930s.

War years 
Wartime austerity led to restrictions on the number of new clothes that people bought and the amount of fabric that clothing manufacturers could use. Women working on war service adopted trousers as a practical necessity. The United States government requisitioned all silk supplies, forcing the hosiery industry to completely switch to nylon. In March 1942 the government then requisitioned all nylon for parachutes and other war uses, leaving only the unpopular cotton and rayon stockings. The industry feared that not wearing stockings would become a fad, and advised stores to increase hosiery advertising. When nylon stockings reappeared in the shops there were "nylon riots" as customers fought over the first deliveries.

In Britain, clothing was strictly rationed, with a system of "points", and the Board of Trade issued regulations for "Utility Clothes" in 1941. In America the War Production Board issued its Regulation L85 on March 8, 1942, specifying restrictions for every item of women's clothing. Because the military used so much green and brown dye, manufacturers used more red dye in clothing. Easily laddered stockings were a particular concern in Britain; women were forced to either paint them on (including the back seam) or to join the WRNS, who continued to issue them, in a cunning aid to recruitment.  Later in the war, American soldiers became a source of the new nylon stockings.

Most women wore skirts at or near knee-length, with simply-cut blouses or shirts and square-shouldered jackets. Popular magazines and pattern companies advised women on how to remake men's suits into smart outfits, since the men were in uniform and the cloth would otherwise sit unused.  Eisenhower jackets became popular in this period.  Influenced by the military, these jackets were bloused at the chest and fitted at the waist with a belt. The combination of neat blouses and sensibly tailored suits became the distinctive attire of the working woman, college girl, and young society matron.

The shirtwaist dress, an all-purpose garment, also emerged during the 1930s. The shirtwaist dress was worn for all occasions, besides those that were extremely formal, and were modest in design. The dress could either have long or short sleeves, a modest neckline and skirt that fell below the knee. The bust was rounded but not particularly emphasized and the waistline was often belted in its normal position. Pockets were both functional and used for decoration and were accompanied by buttons down the front, around the sides or up the back of the dress. These dresses often were accompanied by coordination coats, which were made out of contrasting fabric but lined with the dress fabric. The jacket was often constructed in a boxy fashion and had wide lapels, wide shoulders and numerous pockets. The dress and coat combination created an overall effect of sensibility, modesty and girl next door lifestyle that contrasted the very popular, second-skin like style of the bias-cut evening gown.

Headwear 

The 1940s was a period marked by iconic headwear. Because of the war, current European fashion was no longer available to women in the United States. In 1941, hatmakers failed to popularize Chinese and American Indian-based designs, causing one milliner to lament "How different when Paris was the fountainhead of style". As with hosiery hatmakers feared that bareheadness would become popular, and introduced new designs such as "Winged Victory Turbans" and "Commando Caps" in "Victory Gold". American designers, who were often overlooked, became more popular as American women began to wear their designs.  American designers of ready-to-wear contributed in other ways too.  They made improvements to sizing standards and began to use fiber content and care labels in clothing.  Hats were one of the few pieces of clothing that was not rationed during WWII, therefore there was a lot of attention paid to these headpieces. Styles ranged from turbans to straw hats.  The snood was an important accessory to a woman working in the factory. Snoods were fashionable and functional at the same time, they enabled factory women who were wearing pants and jumpsuits to still look feminine. Snoods pulled hair out of the face by containing it all at the back of the head in a hanging net. With all the long hair hanging in the net, the front of the hair was left out and could be curled and styled to glamourize the factory uniforms. Other popular headpieces were variations of headscarves, such as the bandana Rosie the Riveter is pictured wearing in the recruitment posters. Another variation of the headscarf was simply tying a square scarf folded in half under the chin. Later in the 1950s and 60s these headscarves became highly glamorized by celebrities like Audrey Hepburn, Brigitte Bardot, and Jacqueline Kennedy. This glamorized look came from women in the 1940s who wore headscarves over their victory rolls in order to make their simple clothes look dressed up. Draped turbans – sometimes fashioned from headscarves – also made an appearance in fashion, representing the working woman of the period. These were worn by women of all classes.This type of headwear could be glamorous or practical. Turbans were the most functional for the working woman because she was able to have all her hair out of her face and skip washing her hair by covering it with the turban. Both turbans and headscarves were useful for hiding curlers so when a woman got off work all she had to do was take out her curlers and her hair would be set for a night out. All these alternative options to hats were popular, not only for function and glamour, but also because the look could be achieved quite inexpensively.

Swimwear 

An important style that became popular due to the war was the two-piece swimsuit which later led to the Bikini. In 1942, the War Production Board passed a law called the L-85 which put restrictions on clothing production. For swimwear companies the L-85 meant they had to use 10 percent less fabric in all their designs, as a result swimsuits became smaller. Swimsuits had been becoming more minimal for a while but in 1944 Tina Leser debuted one of the first two-piece swimsuits. Even though the bottoms were high waisted, cut low on the legs, and paired with a modest bandeau, Lesers’ two piece was still considered a daring style for the era. According to Sarah Kennedy, author of The Swimsuit: A History of Twentieth-Century Fashion, unlike the bikini the two-piece was created out of necessity and was not meant to be shocking. Apparently there was an unspoken rule that bellybuttons must never show which accounts for the high waisted bottoms. Despite it being scandalous to some, the two-piece was eventually accepted because there really wasn't another option. The L-85 did not only make swimsuits smaller, but it also pushed designers to become more creative with their designs, this led to suits that accentuated and drew attention to women's bodies. This was done by putting boning in the swimwear. Two years after Leser debuted one of the first two-pieces, the bikini was invented in 1946 by a French engineer named Louis Réard. It was apparently named after the Bikini Atoll, which was the site of a nuclear bomb test in 1946, because Réard hoped its impact would be explosive in the fashion world. The bikini was even more daring than the two-piece, thus it did not become popular until 1953 when Brigitte Bardot was photographed in one at the Cannes Film Festival. Although the bikini did become popular in Europe in 1953 it did not become popular in the United States until the 1960s.

Style gallery

1930–1935 

Newspaper advertisement for women's dresses, Paris Dress Shoppe,  Allentown PA, 1930.
Woman's dress, 1931.
A collection of swimwear, Ladies Home Journal, 1932.
Dutch actress Cissy van Bennekom and model Eva Waldschmidt, 1932.
Workers leaving the factory, Buenos Aires, 1933.
Models wearing evening dresses by Jeanne Lanvin, 1933.
Actress Mae West wearing an elaborate nightgown in She Done Him Wrong, 1933.
Portrait of Nan Wood Graham by Grant Wood, wearing a polka dot blouse and Marcel wave hair, 1933
Outlaw Bonnie Parker standing in front of a Ford Model 18, 1934.
Girl in Dallas, Texas wears a sweater and mid-calf length skirt with pleats, 1934.
Singer Annette Hanshaw models an evening dress designed by Gladys Parker, 1934
Young woman wearing a long, form-fitting dress with puffed sleeves, 1935.
Actress Elisabeth Bergner wears a fashionably tilted hat and a leopard fur coat, 1935.

1936–1939 

Young woman wears her hair in short, hard curls framing her face, but smooth at the crown to accommodate her small hat, 1936.
Young woman wears a printed dress fitted through the midriff with short puffed sleeves, Minnesota, 1936.
Carole Lombard in a gown Travis Banton designed for her personal wardrobe, 1936
Writer Alfonsina Storni at the beach resort city of Mar del Plata, 1936.
Dutch tourist in Paris, 1937.
Art exhibit of artist Roy Parkinson and his pupils, Brisbane, Queensland, Australia, 1937.
Window shoppers outside Simpsons department store in Toronto, Ontario, Canada, 1937.
Portrait of writer Zora Neale Hurston, 1938
Middle aged couple, USA, July, 1938
Plastic face protection from snowstorms. Canada, Montreal, 1939
"Cyclone" evening dress by Jeanne Lanvin, 1939.

1940–1945 

Sportswear of 1941 featured square shoulders and flared shorts.
Actress Lana Turner examines cotton stockings, wearing a smart knee-length suit with square shoulders, in this Farm Security Administration photo of 1941
Actress Rita Hayworth in a pink and silver lamé evening dress by Howard Greer, 1941.
Clerk at North American Aviation in California wears a pompadour hairstyle with back hair confined in a floral snood tied with a bow, 1942.
Girls wearing swimsuits in Hungary, 1942.
Women employees of the Aluminum Co. of Kingston, Ontario wear knee-length skirts with blouses or sweaters (often with a string of graduated pearls), 1943.
Women's fashion in Europe (Hungary, 1943).
Singer Peggy Lee wears a pompadour hairstyle and an evening dress with a "sweetheart" neckline in the film Stage Door Canteen, 1943.
Typical women's and kids' fashion in Europe during the Forties, Hungary in 1943, during the Second World War.
Writer Lillian Smith wears a dark suit with an open-collared blouse, 1944.
Bathing suits worn by members of the WACs in North Africa, 1944.
Argentine actresses Susana Freyre, Nelly Darén and Rita Juárez in Swan Song, 1945.

Menswear

Overview 
For men, the most noticeable effect of the general sobering associated with the Great Depression was that the range of colors became more subdued.  The bright colors popular in the 1920s fell out of fashion.

Suits 
By the early 1930s, the "drape cut" or "London Drape" suit championed by Frederick Scholte, tailor to the Prince of Wales, was taking the world of men's fashion by storm. The new suit was softer and more flexible in construction than the suits of the previous generation; extra fabric in the shoulder and armscye, light padding, a slightly nipped waist, and fuller sleeves tapered at the wrist resulted in a cut with flattering folds or drapes front and back that enhanced a man's figure. The straight leg wide-trousers (the standard size was 23 inches at the cuff) that men had worn in the 1920s also became tapered at the bottom for the first time around 1935. The new suit was adopted enthusiastically by Hollywood stars including Fred Astaire, Cary Grant, and Gary Cooper, who became the new fashion trendsetters after the Prince's abdication and exile. By the early 1940s, Hollywood tailors had exaggerated the drape to the point of caricature, outfitting film noir mobsters and private eyes in suits with heavily padded chests, enormous shoulders, and wide flowing trousers. Musicians and other fashion experimenters adopted the most extreme form of the drape, the zoot suit, with very high waists, pegged trousers, and long coats.

Formal wear 
In the early 1930s, new forms of summer evening clothes were introduced as appropriate for the popular seaside resorts.  The waist-length white mess jacket, worn with a cummerbund rather than a waistcoat, was modeled after formal clothing of British officers in tropical climates.  This was followed by a white dinner jacket, single or double-breasted.  Both white jackets were worn with black bow ties and black trousers trimmed with braid down the side seams.

Sportswear 
By 1933, knickerbockers and plus-fours, which had been commonly worn as sports-clothes in the 1920s had lost favor to casual trousers among the fashionable. In Britain and South Africa, brightly striped blazers in red, white and blue were often worn in the summer both as informal wear, and for sports such as tennis, rowing or cricket. This continued until wartime rationing rendered the distinctive fabric unobtainable.

Accessories 
The most common hat of this period was the fedora, often worn tipped down over one eye at a rakish angle. The more conservative Homburg also remained popular, especially among older people and even began to be worn with semi-formal evening clothes in place of the tophat, which in turn became confined to wear with formal. Neckties were wide, and bold geometric designs were popular, including stripes, and quadrilateral designs.

Wartime restrictions 
Many things affected the style of clothes that people wore. Austerity also affected men's civilian clothes during the war years.  The British "Utility Suit" and American "Victory Suit" were both made of wool-synthetic blend yarns, without pleats, cuffs (turn-ups), sleeve buttons or patch pockets; jackets were shorter, trousers were narrower, and double-breasted suits were made without vests (waistcoats).  Men who were not in uniform could, of course, continue to wear pre-war suits they already owned, and many did so.

Style gallery 1930s 

Golfing attire of 1930, worn by Babe Ruth and former New York governor Al Smith - State Archive of Florida.
Casual men's wear with striped jacket and pleated trousers , 1930.
Double-breasted suits have pocket flaps and functional buttonholes in both lapels. President Franklin D. Roosevelt, 1934.
Photo of Sydney Cup, Randwick, 1937.
Photo of Walt Disney shows the padded shoulder and widening lapels of 1938.

Style gallery 1940–45

Photo of Charles Spurgeon Johnson wearing a wide-lapelled suit with a striped necktie, c. 1940.
Photo of Stark Young in a herringbone tweed suit, 1940.
Writer William Saroyan wears the wide, patterned necktie fashionable in 1940.
Overcoats of Wendell Willkie, Thorne and Cowles
Jazz bandleader Tiny Bradshaw wears a double-breasted suit with wide lapels and tapered trousers, accessorized with a large pocket square (handkerchief) and a patterned necktie, 1942
Actor Walter Pidgeon wears a houndstooth check jacket, 1942.
Extreme zoot suits of 1942
Man skiing in Hungary, 1943.

Working clothes
Both men and women working on war service wore practical trousers or overalls. Women bundled their hair up in caps, scarves, and snoods.

Young men of the Civilian Conservation Corps working in loose-cut trousers and brimmed hats, Virginia, c. 1933.
Shepherd, Montana, 1942.
Women working on war service in Texas wear their hair in snoods, 1942.
Men and women of North American Aviation on lunch break wear short-sleeved shirts and trousers, 1942.
Woman working in the Richmond shipyards wears practical overalls and a cap, 1943.

Children's clothes

Children's clothing in the 1930s and 1940s was heavily impacted by the problems of the era with many families suffering from financial difficulties from the Great Depression and material shortages and rationing during the Second World War. Clothing was frequently homemade with mothers often making garments from other items such as sacks. However, these outfits were often based on popular fashions. Sewing patterns to guide their creation were often included in magazines. Exchanges were set up where children's clothes which had been outgrown by their previous owners could be handed down.

However, fashion continued to be a major influence on the way children were clothed with contemporary writing suggesting that many were interested in how they looked and keeping up with current trends. Frilly dresses with embellished puffy sleeves inspired by those worn by child fashion icons such as American filmstar Shirley Temple and British princesses Elizabeth and Margaret were popular with girls in the 1930s. Hemlines were shorter for younger girls and reached below the knee as they grew older. Young boys were generally dressed in short trousers usually combined with a shirt but sailor suits also remained popular.

Gallery

1930s 

Girl receiving a vaccination 
Children in Michigan Hill, Washington
Child's birthday party in Todman Ave, Kensington, Sydney
School choir in Pie Town, New Mexico
German children, the boy appears to be wearing a sailor suit
Girl learning how to ride a bike with friends at an unknown location
Studio photograph of a family dressed in outdoor clothing
Illustration originating in the Soviet Union depicting a workplace creche
Class photo at a Sunday School in Washington
Boys playing on stilts in Israel
Children gather prior to a festival parade in Ochsenfurt, Bavaria

1940–1945 

 Greek Archbishop with an advisor's daughter
 Children sat with their mother in a private living room in London
 Children in Budapest
 Belgian refugees in London
 Italian postcard featuring an infant
 Boys in the British occupied Faroe Islands stood with a sentry
 Two girls with an older woman in Slovenia
Busy playground in Balgowlah, New South Wales
Girls sat on a porch in Louisiana 
Children at a wartime factory nursery in Toronto, Ontario 
Children studying at a school in Cambridgeshire, England

See also
 Interwar period
 Home front during World War II
 United States home front during World War II
 United Kingdom home front during World War II
 Australian home front during World War II

Notes

References and further reading
 Arnold, Janet: Patterns of Fashion 2: Englishwomen's Dresses and Their Construction c. 1860–1940, Wace 1966, Macmillan 1972. Revised metric edition, Drama Books 1977. 
 Black, J. Anderson, and Madge Garland, A History of Fashion, New York, Morrow, 1975
 Boyer, G. Bruce, Eminently Suitable, New York: W. W. Norton & Co. Inc., 1990, 
 Brockman, Helen, The Theory of Fashion Design, New York: John Wiley and Sons, 1965 
 Bryant, Nancy O. "The interrelationship between decorative and structural design in Madeleine Vionnet's Work", Costume 1991, V 25, pp. 73–88
 Hawes, Elizabeth: Fashion is Spinach, New York: Random House, 1938
 Hunt, Marsha: The Way We Wore: Styles of the 1930s and '40s and Our World Since Then, Fallbrook Pub. Ltd., 1993, 
 LaValley, Satch: "Hollywood and Seventh Avenue: The Impact of Historical Films on Fashion", in Hollywood and History: Costume Design in Film, Los Angeles County Museum of Art/Thames and Hudson, 1987, 
 Laver, James: The Concise History of Costume and Fashion, Abrams, 1979.
 Leese, Elizabeth: Costume Design in the Movies, Dover Books, 1991, 
 Steele, Valerie: Paris Fashion: A Cultural History, Oxford University Press, 1988, 
 Steele, Valerie: The Corset, Yale University Press, 2001
 Walker, Richard: The Savile Row Story, Prion, 1988, 
 Wilcox, R. Turner: The Mode in Fashion, 1942; 2nd expanded edition New York: Scribners, 1958.

External links
 1930s Fashion History
 Chicago Woolen Mills catalog for 1937
 Fashions from the Sears Catalog, 1934
 Picture galleries of 1930s fashions (UK)
 
1930s Fashion Plates of men, women, and children's fashion from The Metropolitan Museum of Art Libraries

1930s fashion
1940s fashion
Home front during World War II